SFA may refer to:

In science and technology

In medicine 
 Superficial femoral artery, a large artery in the thigh

In chemistry
 Saturated fatty acid, a type of fatty acid with no double bonds
 Segmented flow analysis, a technique and class of instrument used in chemical analysis
 Sodium fluoroacetate, an organofluorine chemical compound, and the sodium salt of fluoroacetic acid

In physical science and engineering
 Substance flow analysis, a method of analyzing the flows of a material in a well-defined system
 Surface forces apparatus, a scientific instrument and technique
 Svenska Flygmotor Aktiebolaget late 1940s Swedish aero-engine manufacturer

Other uses in science and technology
 Sales force automation, information systems used in customer relationship marketing
 Simple feature access, a standard storage and access model for geographical data
 Single Frequency Approach, an aviation procedure
 Stochastic Frontier Analysis, a method of economic modeling
 Striker Fired Action, in firearms

Organizations

In education 
 Sabena Flight Academy, Belgium
 Skills Funding Agency, England
 Stephen F. Austin State University, Nacogdoches, Texas, US
 Success for All, school curricula, US

Other organizations
 Space Force Association
 Special Forces Association
 Free Syrian Army
 Maghaweir al-Thowra, officially the Syrian Free Army
 Somali Film Agency, a film regulatory body
 Student/Farmworker Alliance, Immokalee, Florida, US
 Swedish Fortifications Agency
 Singapore Food Agency

Sports
 Scottish Football Association, the football governing body in Scotland
 Sudan Football Association
 Sarawak FA, a Malaysian association football club
 Selangor FA, a Malaysian association football club

Other uses
 Jonathan Davis and the SFA, an American metal band
 Super Furry Animals, a Welsh rock band
 Stratford International station
 Six Flags America, an amusement park in Bowie, MD Six Flags AstroWorld, a former amusement park located in Houston, Texas